The Executive Council of Abia State
(informally and more commonly, the Cabinet of Abia State) is the highest formal governmental body that plays important roles in the Government of Abia State headed by the Governor of Abia State. It consists of the deputy governor, Secretary to the State Government, chief of staff, commissioners who preside over ministerial departments, and the governor's special aides. Appointment into these positions except the position of deputy governor is exercised by the governor on approval and confirmation by the Abia State House of Assembly.

Functions
Officially, the executive council exists to advice and direct the governor in order to improve the governor's performance on the welfare of the state. Their appointment as members of the executive council gives them the authority to execute power.

Current cabinet
The current executive council is serving under the Okezie Ikpeazu administration, who took office as the 4th governor of Abia State on 29 May 2015. On the 17th of October 2019, the executive governor of Abia State Okezie Ikpeazu swore in a new Cabinet except the office of his chief of staff, Commissioner for Information and the Commissioner for Justice and attorney-general, Barr Uche Ihediwa.

See also
Abia State Government

References

 
Abia